CloudMask is a data privacy company for public or private cloud applications.

History 
Launched in 2013, Dr Wael Aggan, the CEO and Co-Founder of CloudMask and Tarek El-Gillani, the CTO and Co-Founder of CloudMask, an information privacy company based out of Ottawa, Canada. Prior to CloudMask, the two started ViaSafe and TradeMerit, which were later acquired.

In 2015, CloudMask Engine received Common Criteria Certification, for their data protection services.

Since, CloudMask has partnered with AllStream and Clio, helping secure their customers' data.

Overview 
CloudMask patent technology masks production data in real-time. Running on end devices, it transparently intercepts and changes the production data so that the unauthorized data requesters do not get access to sensitive data, while no physical changes to the original production data take place.

By protecting against data theft, masking acts as a compliance solution for organizations subject to data privacy regulations such as HIPAA, GDPR, and PCI. Unauthorized users who breach perimeter security can only see the masked data and data privacy is upheld.

Products 
 Secure communication for Gmail and Outlook.
 Confidential storage and file sharing for Google Drive and Box.
 Confidential practice management for Clio.
 Secure case management for Salesforce.
 Custom configuration, embedding protection layer for business applications.

References 

Information privacy
Cryptography
Email clients
Online companies of Canada